Standings and results for Group 4 of the UEFA Euro 2004 qualifying tournament.

Group 4 consisted of Hungary, Latvia, Poland, San Marino and Sweden. Group winners were Sweden, who finished one point clear of second-placed team Latvia who qualified for the play-offs.

Standings

Matches

Goalscorers

References
UEFA Page
RSSSF Page

Group 4
2002 in Swedish football
2003 in Swedish football
2002 in Latvian football
2003 in Latvian football
Latvia at UEFA Euro 2004
2002–03 in Polish football
2003–04 in Polish football
2002–03 in Hungarian football
2003–04 in Hungarian football
2002–03 in San Marino football
2003–04 in San Marino football
Sweden at UEFA Euro 2004